The Walter J. Squire House in Somerville, Massachusetts is a well-preserved transitional Italianate/Queen Anne house.  The basic 2.5-story, front gable, three bay side entrance layout was fairly typical for Italianate houses in the city, as are the paired cornice brackets and hoods over the windows.  The porch, however, has Queen Anne elements, including turned posts and the rising sun motif on its gable.

In 1989 the house was listed on the National Register of Historic Places as the House at 10 Arlington Street.

Gallery

See also
National Register of Historic Places listings in Somerville, Massachusetts

References

Houses on the National Register of Historic Places in Somerville, Massachusetts